The Eighth Philippine Legislature was the meeting of the legislature of the Philippine Islands under the sovereign control of the United States from 1928 to 1930.

Members

Senate 

Notes

House of Representatives 

Notes

See also 
Congress of the Philippines
Senate of the Philippines
House of Representatives of the Philippines

External links

Further reading
Philippine House of Representatives Congressional Library

08